Gary Anderson may refer to:

Music
Gary M. Anderson (born 1947), musician, conductor, arranger, music producer
Gary Stephen Anderson or Angry Anderson (born 1947), Australian rock singer-songwriter and media personality
Gary Levone Anderson or Gary U.S. Bonds (born 1939), American R&B and rock singer

Sports

American football
Gary Anderson (offensive lineman) (born 1955), American
Gary Anderson (placekicker) (born 1959), South African placekicker
Gary Anderson (running back) (born 1961), American

Other sports
Gary Anderson (cyclist) (born 1967), New Zealand cyclist
Gary Anderson (darts player) (born 1970), Scottish darts player
Gary Anderson (motorsport) (born 1951), semi-retired F1 car designer
Gary Anderson (swimmer) (born 1969), Canadian swimmer
Gary Anderson (sport shooter) (born 1939), American competitive shooter and Olympic Gold Medal winner (2)

Others
Gary Anderson (designer) (born 1947), designer of the Universal Recycling Symbol

See also
Gary Andersen (born 1964), American football coach
Gary Andersson (born 1958), Swedish Olympic swimmer
Gerry Anderson (disambiguation)
Jerry Anderson (disambiguation)